Lasith Fernando (born 8 April 1983) is a Sri Lankan cricketer. He played 91 first-class and 54 List A matches between 2002 and 2017. He was also part of Sri Lanka's squad for the 2002 Under-19 Cricket World Cup.

References

External links
 

1983 births
Living people
Sri Lankan cricketers
Kalutara District cricketers
Nondescripts Cricket Club cricketers
Ruhuna cricketers
Sinhalese Sports Club cricketers
Cricketers from Colombo